The 1963–64 Detroit Red Wings season saw the Red Wings finish in fourth place in the NHL with a record of 30 wins, 29 losses, and 11 ties. They defeated the Chicago Black Hawks in seven games in the Semi-finals before losing a seven-game Stanley Cup Final to the Toronto Maple Leafs.

Offseason

Final standings

Regular season

Record vs. opponents

Schedule and results

Regular season

|-  style="text-align:center; background:#cfc;"
|1||W||October 10, 1963||5–3 || style="text-align:left;"|  Chicago Black Hawks (1963–64) ||1–0–0
|-  style="text-align:center; background:#cfc;"
|2||W||October 13, 1963||3–0 || style="text-align:left;"|  Boston Bruins (1963–64) ||2–0–0
|-  style="text-align:center; background:#fbb;"
|3||L||October 16, 1963||0–3 || style="text-align:left;"| @ New York Rangers (1963–64) ||2–1–0
|-  style="text-align:center; background:#fbb;"
|4||L||October 19, 1963||1–2 || style="text-align:left;"| @ Toronto Maple Leafs (1963–64) ||2–2–0
|-  style="text-align:center; background:#cfc;"
|5||W||October 20, 1963||3–2 || style="text-align:left;"|  Toronto Maple Leafs (1963–64) ||3–2–0
|- style="text-align:center;"
|6||T||October 24, 1963||2–2 || style="text-align:left;"|  Chicago Black Hawks (1963–64) ||3–2–1
|-  style="text-align:center; background:#fbb;"
|7||L||October 27, 1963||4–6 || style="text-align:left;"|  Montreal Canadiens (1963–64) ||3–3–1
|-  style="text-align:center; background:#fbb;"
|8||L||October 29, 1963||1–5 || style="text-align:left;"| @ Chicago Black Hawks (1963–64) ||3–4–1
|-  style="text-align:center; background:#cfc;"
|9||W||October 31, 1963||4–1 || style="text-align:left;"|  New York Rangers (1963–64) ||4–4–1
|-

|-  style="text-align:center; background:#fbb;"
|10||L||November 2, 1963||1–5 || style="text-align:left;"| @ Montreal Canadiens (1963–64) ||4–5–1
|-  style="text-align:center; background:#fbb;"
|11||L||November 3, 1963||1–4 || style="text-align:left;"| @ Boston Bruins (1963–64) ||4–6–1
|-  style="text-align:center; background:#cfc;"
|12||W||November 7, 1963||1–0 || style="text-align:left;"|  New York Rangers (1963–64) ||5–6–1
|-  style="text-align:center; background:#cfc;"
|13||W||November 10, 1963||3–0 || style="text-align:left;"|  Montreal Canadiens (1963–64) ||6–6–1
|- style="text-align:center;"
|14||T||November 16, 1963||1–1 || style="text-align:left;"| @ Boston Bruins (1963–64) ||6–6–2
|-  style="text-align:center; background:#fbb;"
|15||L||November 17, 1963||2–5 || style="text-align:left;"| @ New York Rangers (1963–64) ||6–7–2
|-  style="text-align:center; background:#fbb;"
|16||L||November 20, 1963||2–5 || style="text-align:left;"| @ Chicago Black Hawks (1963–64) ||6–8–2
|-  style="text-align:center; background:#fbb;"
|17||L||November 27, 1963||2–3 || style="text-align:left;"| @ New York Rangers (1963–64) ||6–9–2
|-  style="text-align:center; background:#fbb;"
|18||L||November 28, 1963||3–7 || style="text-align:left;"|  Montreal Canadiens (1963–64) ||6–10–2
|- style="text-align:center;"
|19||T||November 30, 1963||1–1 || style="text-align:left;"| @ Toronto Maple Leafs (1963–64) ||6–10–3
|-

|-  style="text-align:center; background:#fbb;"
|20||L||December 1, 1963||1–4 || style="text-align:left;"|  Toronto Maple Leafs (1963–64) ||6–11–3
|-  style="text-align:center; background:#cfc;"
|21||W||December 5, 1963||4–2 || style="text-align:left;"|  Boston Bruins (1963–64) ||7–11–3
|-  style="text-align:center; background:#fbb;"
|22||L||December 7, 1963||2–5 || style="text-align:left;"| @ Montreal Canadiens (1963–64) ||7–12–3
|-  style="text-align:center; background:#fbb;"
|23||L||December 8, 1963||3–5 || style="text-align:left;"|  Toronto Maple Leafs (1963–64) ||7–13–3
|-  style="text-align:center; background:#cfc;"
|24||W||December 11, 1963||3–1 || style="text-align:left;"| @ Toronto Maple Leafs (1963–64) ||8–13–3
|-  style="text-align:center; background:#cfc;"
|25||W||December 14, 1963||5–4 || style="text-align:left;"|  Chicago Black Hawks (1963–64) ||9–13–3
|- style="text-align:center;"
|26||T||December 15, 1963||4–4 || style="text-align:left;"| @ Chicago Black Hawks (1963–64) ||9–13–4
|- style="text-align:center;"
|27||T||December 18, 1963||1–1 || style="text-align:left;"| @ New York Rangers (1963–64) ||9–13–5
|-  style="text-align:center; background:#cfc;"
|28||W||December 19, 1963||3–0 || style="text-align:left;"|  Boston Bruins (1963–64) ||10–13–5
|-  style="text-align:center; background:#fbb;"
|29||L||December 21, 1963||0–2 || style="text-align:left;"| @ Toronto Maple Leafs (1963–64) ||10–14–5
|-  style="text-align:center; background:#fbb;"
|30||L||December 22, 1963||1–6 || style="text-align:left;"|  Montreal Canadiens (1963–64) ||10–15–5
|-  style="text-align:center; background:#cfc;"
|31||W||December 25, 1963||4–3 || style="text-align:left;"|  New York Rangers (1963–64) ||11–15–5
|- style="text-align:center;"
|32||T||December 28, 1963||1–1 || style="text-align:left;"| @ Montreal Canadiens (1963–64) ||11–15–6
|-  style="text-align:center; background:#cfc;"
|33||W||December 29, 1963||2–1 || style="text-align:left;"|  Boston Bruins (1963–64) ||12–15–6
|-  style="text-align:center; background:#fbb;"
|34||L||December 31, 1963||4–5 || style="text-align:left;"|  Toronto Maple Leafs (1963–64) ||12–16–6
|-

|-  style="text-align:center; background:#fbb;"
|35||L||January 4, 1964||2–5 || style="text-align:left;"| @ New York Rangers (1963–64) ||12–17–6
|- style="text-align:center;"
|36||T||January 5, 1964||3–3 || style="text-align:left;"|  Montreal Canadiens (1963–64) ||12–17–7
|-  style="text-align:center; background:#cfc;"
|37||W||January 7, 1964||5–0 || style="text-align:left;"| @ Boston Bruins (1963–64) ||13–17–7
|-  style="text-align:center; background:#cfc;"
|38||W||January 9, 1964||5–3 || style="text-align:left;"|  Chicago Black Hawks (1963–64) ||14–17–7
|-  style="text-align:center; background:#fbb;"
|39||L||January 11, 1964||3–6 || style="text-align:left;"| @ Chicago Black Hawks (1963–64) ||14–18–7
|-  style="text-align:center; background:#cfc;"
|40||W||January 12, 1964||5–3 || style="text-align:left;"|  New York Rangers (1963–64) ||15–18–7
|-  style="text-align:center; background:#fbb;"
|41||L||January 16, 1964||1–5 || style="text-align:left;"| @ Boston Bruins (1963–64) ||15–19–7
|-  style="text-align:center; background:#cfc;"
|42||W||January 18, 1964||2–0 || style="text-align:left;"| @ Montreal Canadiens (1963–64) ||16–19–7
|-  style="text-align:center; background:#fbb;"
|43||L||January 19, 1964||1–3 || style="text-align:left;"|  New York Rangers (1963–64) ||16–20–7
|-  style="text-align:center; background:#cfc;"
|44||W||January 25, 1964||5–3 || style="text-align:left;"|  Chicago Black Hawks (1963–64) ||17–20–7
|-  style="text-align:center; background:#fbb;"
|45||L||January 26, 1964||2–3 || style="text-align:left;"| @ New York Rangers (1963–64) ||17–21–7
|- style="text-align:center;"
|46||T||January 29, 1964||2–2 || style="text-align:left;"| @ Chicago Black Hawks (1963–64) ||17–21–8
|-

|-  style="text-align:center; background:#fbb;"
|47||L||February 1, 1964||3–9 || style="text-align:left;"| @ Montreal Canadiens (1963–64) ||17–22–8
|- style="text-align:center;"
|48||T||February 2, 1964||2–2 || style="text-align:left;"|  Toronto Maple Leafs (1963–64) ||17–22–9
|-  style="text-align:center; background:#fbb;"
|49||L||February 5, 1964||2–4 || style="text-align:left;"| @ Chicago Black Hawks (1963–64) ||17–23–9
|-  style="text-align:center; background:#cfc;"
|50||W||February 6, 1964||4–0 || style="text-align:left;"|  Chicago Black Hawks (1963–64) ||18–23–9
|-  style="text-align:center; background:#cfc;"
|51||W||February 8, 1964||3–2 || style="text-align:left;"| @ Boston Bruins (1963–64) ||19–23–9
|-  style="text-align:center; background:#cfc;"
|52||W||February 9, 1964||4–2 || style="text-align:left;"|  New York Rangers (1963–64) ||20–23–9
|-  style="text-align:center; background:#cfc;"
|53||W||February 13, 1964||4–1 || style="text-align:left;"|  Boston Bruins (1963–64) ||21–23–9
|-  style="text-align:center; background:#cfc;"
|54||W||February 15, 1964||4–1 || style="text-align:left;"| @ Montreal Canadiens (1963–64) ||22–23–9
|-  style="text-align:center; background:#fbb;"
|55||L||February 16, 1964||2–5 || style="text-align:left;"|  Montreal Canadiens (1963–64) ||22–24–9
|- style="text-align:center;"
|56||T||February 19, 1964||1–1 || style="text-align:left;"| @ Toronto Maple Leafs (1963–64) ||22–24–10
|-  style="text-align:center; background:#cfc;"
|57||W||February 22, 1964||3–2 || style="text-align:left;"|  Boston Bruins (1963–64) ||23–24–10
|-  style="text-align:center; background:#cfc;"
|58||W||February 23, 1964||3–2 || style="text-align:left;"|  Montreal Canadiens (1963–64) ||24–24–10
|-  style="text-align:center; background:#fbb;"
|59||L||February 27, 1964||2–4 || style="text-align:left;"| @ Chicago Black Hawks (1963–64) ||24–25–10
|-  style="text-align:center; background:#fbb;"
|60||L||February 29, 1964||1–2 || style="text-align:left;"| @ Boston Bruins (1963–64) ||24–26–10
|-

|- style="text-align:center;"
|61||T||March 1, 1964||2–2 || style="text-align:left;"| @ New York Rangers (1963–64) ||24–26–11
|-  style="text-align:center; background:#cfc;"
|62||W||March 3, 1964||3–2 || style="text-align:left;"|  Toronto Maple Leafs (1963–64) ||25–26–11
|-  style="text-align:center; background:#cfc;"
|63||W||March 5, 1964||7–5 || style="text-align:left;"| @ Montreal Canadiens (1963–64) ||26–26–11
|-  style="text-align:center; background:#fbb;"
|64||L||March 7, 1964||2–4 || style="text-align:left;"| @ Toronto Maple Leafs (1963–64) ||26–27–11
|-  style="text-align:center; background:#cfc;"
|65||W||March 8, 1964||5–3 || style="text-align:left;"| @ Boston Bruins (1963–64) ||27–27–11
|-  style="text-align:center; background:#cfc;"
|66||W||March 12, 1964||2–1 || style="text-align:left;"|  Boston Bruins (1963–64) ||28–27–11
|-  style="text-align:center; background:#cfc;"
|67||W||March 15, 1964||5–3 || style="text-align:left;"|  Chicago Black Hawks (1963–64) ||29–27–11
|-  style="text-align:center; background:#cfc;"
|68||W||March 19, 1964||9–3 || style="text-align:left;"|  New York Rangers (1963–64) ||30–27–11
|-  style="text-align:center; background:#fbb;"
|69||L||March 21, 1964||3–5 || style="text-align:left;"| @ Toronto Maple Leafs (1963–64) ||30–28–11
|-  style="text-align:center; background:#fbb;"
|70||L||March 22, 1964||1–4 || style="text-align:left;"|  Toronto Maple Leafs (1963–64) ||30–29–11
|-

Playoffs

|- align="center" bgcolor="#FFBBBB"
|1||L||March 26, 1964||1–4 || || align="left" | @ Chicago Black Hawks (1963–64) || 0–1
|- align="center" bgcolor="#CCFFCC"
|2||W||March 29, 1964||5–4 || || align="left" | @ Chicago Black Hawks (1963–64) || 1–1
|- align="center" bgcolor="#CCFFCC"
|3||W||March 31, 1964||3–0 || || align="left" | Chicago Black Hawks (1963–64) || 2–1
|- align="center" bgcolor="#FFBBBB"
|4||L||April 2, 1964||2–3 || OT || align="left" | Chicago Black Hawks (1963–64) || 2–2
|- align="center" bgcolor="#FFBBBB"
|5||L||April 5, 1964||2–3 || || align="left" | @ Chicago Black Hawks (1963–64) || 2–3
|- align="center" bgcolor="#CCFFCC"
|6||W||April 7, 1964||7–2 || || align="left" | Chicago Black Hawks (1963–64) || 3–3
|- align="center" bgcolor="#CCFFCC"
|7||W||April 9, 1964||4–2 || || align="left" | @ Chicago Black Hawks (1963–64) || 4–3
|-

|- align="center" bgcolor="#FFBBBB"
|1||L||April 11, 1964||2–3 || || align="left" | @ Toronto Maple Leafs (1963–64) || 0–1
|- align="center" bgcolor="#CCFFCC"
|2||W||April 14, 1964||4–3 || OT || align="left" | @ Toronto Maple Leafs (1963–64) || 1–1
|- align="center" bgcolor="#CCFFCC"
|3||W||April 16, 1964||4–3 || || align="left" | Toronto Maple Leafs (1963–64) || 2–1
|- align="center" bgcolor="#FFBBBB"
|4||L||April 18, 1964||2–4 || || align="left" | Toronto Maple Leafs (1963–64) || 2–2
|- align="center" bgcolor="#CCFFCC"
|5||W||April 21, 1964||2–1 || || align="left" | @ Toronto Maple Leafs (1963–64) || 3–2
|- align="center" bgcolor="#FFBBBB"
|6||L||April 23, 1964||3–4 || OT || align="left" | Toronto Maple Leafs (1963–64) || 3–3
|- align="center" bgcolor="#FFBBBB"
|7||L||April 25, 1964||0–4 || || align="left" | @ Toronto Maple Leafs (1963–64) || 3–4
|-

Player statistics

Regular season
Scoring

Goaltending

Playoffs
Scoring

Goaltending

Note: Pos = Position; GP = Games played; G = Goals; A = Assists; Pts = Points; +/- = Plus-minus PIM = Penalty minutes; PPG = Power-play goals; SHG = Short-handed goals; GWG = Game-winning goals;
      MIN = Minutes played; W = Wins; L = Losses; T = Ties; GA = Goals against; GAA = Goals-against average;  SO = Shutouts;

Draft picks
Detroit's draft picks at the 1963 NHL Amateur Draft held at the Queen Elizabeth Hotel in Montreal, Quebec.

Awards and honors

References
 Red Wings on Hockey Database
 Red Wings on Hockey Reference

Detroit
Detroit
Detroit Red Wings seasons
Detroit Red Wings
Detroit Red Wings